Ughelli Township Stadium is a stadium in Ughelli, Nigeria. It is currently used mostly for football matches and is the temporary home stadium of Ocean Boys FC. The stadium has a capacity of 5,000 people and was built in 2002.

References

Construction pictures
Okocha Stadium ready for WAFU - Oleh, Ughelli, Oghara too

Football venues in Nigeria
Delta State